The Ningde dialect is a dialect of Eastern Min Chinese spoken in urban areas of Ningde, China, which is a prefecture-level city in the northeastern coast of Fujian province.

Phonology
The Ningde dialect has 15 initials, 78 rimes and 7 tones.

Initials

Rimes

Tones

Initial assimilation
The two-syllable initial assimilation rules are shown in the table below:

Tone sandhi
The Ningde dialect has extremely extensive tone sandhi rules: in an utterance, only the last syllable pronounced is not affected by the rules. The two-syllable tonal sandhi rules are shown in the table below (the columns give the first syllable's original citation tone, while the rows give the citation tone of the second syllable):

References

Eastern Min